Soutra Gilmour is a British set designer. She was born in London and trained at the Wimbledon School of Art. She is primarily known for her work on the London stage. She won the Evening Standard Award for Best Set Design in 2012 for her work on the Donmar Warehouse production of Inadmissible Evidence and the National Theatre production of Antigone. She is also a past nominee for the Olivier Award.  Most recently Gilmour has been praised for her work on London's St. James Theatre revival of Urinetown: The Musical.

Gilmour is one of the most in demand theatre creatives across the UK of the 2000s having designed over 60 drama and opera productions, largely in London theatres.

Gilmour designed Running With Lions by Sian Carter at the Lyric Theatre, Hammersmith in 2022.

References

Year of birth missing (living people)
British scenic designers
Designers from London
Living people
Women scenic designers